Inge Leurs (born 1 January 1975) is a former Dutch woman cricketer. She made her international debut in the inaugural edition of the Women's Cricket World Cup Qualifier in 2003. Inge has played in 4 Women's ODIs representing Dutch cricket team.

References

External links 
Profile at CricHQ
Profile at Women's cricket

1975 births
Living people
Dutch women cricketers
Netherlands women One Day International cricketers
Sportspeople from Venlo